Rezvino is a rural locality (a village) in Staroselskoye Rural Settlement, Vologodsky District, Vologda Oblast, Russia. The population was 12 as of 2002.

Geography 
Rezvino is located 63 km west of Vologda (the district's administrative centre) by road. Murmanovo is the nearest rural locality.

References 

Rural localities in Vologodsky District